Sylvia Filipsson (later Hellström, born 22 May 1953) is a former ice speed skater from Sweden. She was part of the Swedish Olympic team in 1972, 1976 and 1980 with the best result of fifth place over 1500 m in 1980. She competed in 10 world allround championships, and placed fourth in 1980, sixth in 1976, seventh in 1978 and eighth in 1979.

Her brother Tord Filipsson is a former Olympic cyclist.

References

1953 births
Living people
Swedish female speed skaters
Speed skaters at the 1972 Winter Olympics
Speed skaters at the 1976 Winter Olympics
Speed skaters at the 1980 Winter Olympics
Olympic speed skaters of Sweden
Sportspeople from Värmland County